KZPO (103.3 FM) was a radio station broadcasting classic nostalgia hits from the 1940s to the 1970s. It was self-identified as the nostalgia station. Licensed to Lindsay, California, USA, it served the Visalia-Tulare-Hanford area of Tulare, Kings and Kern Counties. The station has been in the control of the executor of the estate of Linda Ware since 2004.

History
In a March 2011 storm, the KZPO transmitter at Blue Ridge was knocked out, along with a few other stations. The station was back on the air and could be heard from the north Fresno County area south to the south Kern County line – "Grapevine" area along Interstate 5 into Gorman.

KZPO's license was turned in to FCC in December 2019. And was deleted by July 2020

References

External links

ZPO
Mass media in Tulare County, California
Radio stations established in 1998
Radio stations disestablished in 2019
1998 establishments in California
2019 disestablishments in California
Defunct radio stations in the United States
ZPO